The North Country Thanksgiving Festival (also called the 'North Country Thanksgiving Invitational') was an annual NCAA men's Division I ice hockey tournament held annually at the Appleton Arena and Walker Arena in upstate New York around Thanksgiving. The tournament began in 1970 and was played every year until 1981. Both Clarkson and St. Lawrence served as hosts for the in-season tournament.

Format
Unlike most college hockey tournaments, the North Country Festival did not have a championship game. Instead, each of the four participants would play one another and the team(s) with the best record would be awarded the championship. The series changed to a more normal bracket format in 1974 but returned to the round-robin arrangement the following year. In 1978 and 1981, only three teams participated in the tournament. In 1979 and 1980 the two 'visiting' teams did not play one another.

Yearly results

Team records

Game results

1970

1971

1972

1973

1974

Note: * denotes overtime period(s)

1975

1976

1977

1978

1979

1980

1981

References

Clarkson Golden Knights men's ice hockey
St. Lawrence Saints men's ice hockey
1970 establishments in New York (state)
1981 disestablishments in New York (state)
College ice hockey tournaments in the United States
Ice hockey in New York (state)
Recurring sporting events established in 1970
Recurring sporting events disestablished in 1981
Sports competitions in New York City